Ruben Louis (born 10 July 1997) better known by the stage name Timal is a French rapper born in Saint-Denis, Seine-Saint-Denis and grew up in Champs-sur-Marne, Seine-et-Marne. His Guadeloupean origin inspired to take the name Timal. In 2016, he started posting freestyles on Daymolition's YouTube channel, which gives coverage to young rappers, and became popular with the freestyle series "Rapport". On 27 April 2018, he released his first studio album Trop chaud that was certified gold. He followed it up with album Caliente in 2020 with collaborations from Maes, Leto and PLK.

Discography

Albums

Singles

As lead artist

*Did not appear in the official Belgian Ultratop 50 charts, but rather in the bubbling under Ultratip charts.

As featured artist

Other charted songs

*Did not appear in the official Belgian Ultratop 50 charts, but rather in the bubbling under Ultratip charts.

References

French rappers
1997 births
Living people
Rappers from Seine-et-Marne
French people of Guadeloupean descent